Zion Evangelical Lutheran Church Cemetery is a historic Evangelical Lutheran cemetery and national historic district located near Speedwell, Wythe County, Virginia. The cemetery includes approximately 250–300 total gravestones.  Forty two of the stones have dates ranging from the 1790s to 1840, but all were carved between about 1835 to 1840. It is likely that a skilled carver moved to the area in the mid-1830s and provided stones for many graves, which formerly had been marked with improvised stone or wooden markers, then completed his work by 1840.  The thick sandstone markers are Germanic stones with surviving inscriptions.

It was listed on the National Register of Historic Places in 1979.

References

External links
 
 
 

Historic districts on the National Register of Historic Places in Virginia
Churches in Wythe County, Virginia
Cemeteries on the National Register of Historic Places in Virginia
National Register of Historic Places in Wythe County, Virginia
Lutheran cemeteries in the United States